The 11th Military Police Brigade is a military police brigade of the United States Army Reserve based in Los Alamitos, California.

Subordinate units 

As of 2017 the following units are subordinated to the 11th Military Police Brigade:

 11th Military Police Brigade, in Los Alamitos, California
 96th Military Police Battalion (I/R) (EPW/CI) San Diego, California
 159th Military Police Battalion (CID), in Terre Haute, Indiana
 324th Military Police Battalion (I/R) (EPW/CI), in Fresno, California
 387th Military Police Battalion (CS), in Scottsdale, Arizona
 393rd Military Police Battalion (CID), in Bell, California
 607th Military Police Battalion (CS), in Grand Prairie, Texas
 390th Military Police Battalion (CS), in Joint Base Lewis-McChord, Washington established 2018

Heraldic items

Shoulder sleeve insignia

Description:On a green disc within a  yellow border  in diameter overall, two vertical black bars surmounted by a yellow demi-double bladed battle axe, detailed green, issuing from base.
Symbolism:
Green and yellow are the colors traditionally used by Military Police units.
The circular shape denotes the unit's continual service to maintain justice.
The bars allude to the unit's designation number, "11" and the black color signifies might.
The double-headed axe represents the unit's military readiness and vigilance, to enforce military security.

Background:The shoulder sleeve insignia was approved effective 17 September 2004.

Distinctive unit insignia
Description:A gold color metal and enamel device  in height overall, consisting of a green scroll on two gold rollers, unrolled vertically and bearing two upright gold ionic columns all within a continuous gold motto scroll passing behind the green scroll at the sides and arced across the top and base inscribed on the top arc "COMMAND", and on the lower arc "PLAN AND CONTROL", all in black.
Symbolism:
Green and yellow (gold) are the colors used for Military Police organizations.
The scroll, ancient symbol for a legal document, is emblematic of the laws, decrees and edicts to be maintained by the organization.
Order out of chaos are among the many symbols attributed to two columns and signify the embodiment of the unit's operation and jurisdiction. The two columns also simulate the numeral eleven and allude to the unit's designation.

Background:
The distinctive unit insignia was originally approved for the 11th Military Police Group on 6 June 1969.
It was re-designated for the 11th Military Police Brigade effective 17 September 2004.

Lineage
Constituted 29 December 1966 in the Regular Army as Headquarters and Headquarters Detachment, 11th Military Police Group
Activated 25 February 1967 at Fort Bragg, North Carolina
Inactivated 3 February 1972 at Fort Bragg, North Carolina
Re-designated 13 March 2003 as Headquarters and Headquarters Company, 11th Military Police Brigade; concurrently, withdrawn from the Regular Army and allotted to the Army Reserve
Activated 16 September 2005 at Ashley, Pennsylvania

History 
The 11th Military Police Brigade was originally constituted on 29 December 1966 in the Regular Army as Headquarters and Headquarters Detachment, 11th Military Police Group, and activated 25 February 1967 at Fort Bragg, North Carolina. The brigade received its distinctive unit insignia on 6 June 1969.

It was Inactivated on 3 January 1972 at Fort Bragg, North Carolina.

Re-designated 13 March 2003 as Headquarters and Headquarters Company, 11th Military Police Brigade; concurrently, withdrawn from the Regular Army and allotted to the Army Reserve. It received a shoulder sleeve insignia on 17 September 2004.

Activated 16 September 2005 with headquarters in Ashley, Pennsylvania. The 11th MP Brigade provides peacetime command and control of six Military Police Battalions in Pennsylvania, Texas and Maryland.

The 11th Military Police Brigade served as Task Force MP North, Camp Cropper, Iraq, August 2008 to June 2009 conducting detainee operations. During this time thousands of detained Iraqis were released to their village leadership or turned over to the Government of Iraq for prosecution. The 11th Military Police Brigade earned the Meritorious Unit Commendation for superior performance during this time.

The 11th Military Police Brigade was moved to JFTB Los Alamitos, CA in October 2009.

References 

011
Military units and formations established in 1967
Military units and formations disestablished in 1972
Military units and formations established in 2005
Military units and formations of the United States Army Reserve